Filipe Manuel Cordeiro Duarte (born 30 March 1985, in Lisbon) is a Portuguese born Macanease professional footballer who plays for Chao Pak Keiand the Macau national football team as a central defender.

International career
Filipe Duarte secured Macau's first ever World Cup qualifying win on 6 June 2019 against Sri Lanka. But the Macau Football Association then refused to send the team to Sri Lanka to play the second leg due to security reasons.

International goals
Scores and results list Macau's goal tally first.

Honours
Filipe Duarte was voted Macau Footballer of the Year at the Best Elite League Players (Melhores Jogadores da Liga Elite) awards on 22 September 2019.

References

External links
 
 
 
 

1985 births
Living people
Footballers from Lisbon
Macau footballers
Macau international footballers
Portuguese footballers
Portugal youth international footballers
Macau people of Portuguese descent
Association football defenders
Segunda Divisão players
S.L. Benfica B players
Clube Oriental de Lisboa players
Cypriot First Division players
Apollon Limassol FC players
S.L. Benfica de Macau players
Portuguese expatriate footballers
Expatriate footballers in Cyprus
Expatriate footballers in Macau